The Synairgie Jet Ranger is a French homebuilt ultralight aircraft that was designed and produced by Synairgie of Montauban, introduced in the 1990s. When it was available the aircraft was supplied as a kit for amateur construction.

Despite its name the aircraft is not powered by a turbine engine, but by a choice of piston two stroke and four stroke aircraft engines.

Design and development

A development of the Synairgie Sky Ranger, the Jet Ranger features a strut-braced high-wing, a two-seats-in-tandem enclosed cockpit accessed via doors, fixed tricycle landing gearwith wheel pants and a single engine in tractor configuration.

The aircraft is made from bolted-together aluminum tubing, with its flying surfaces covered in Dacron sailcloth. The tubing used is all straight, to simplify fabrication and repairs.

The manufacturer estimated the construction time from the supplied kit as 100 hours.

Operational history
By 1998 the company reported that 15 kits had been sold and 12 aircraft were completed and flying.

Specifications (Jet Ranger)

References

External links
Photo of a Jet Ranger
Photo of a Jet Ranger

Jet Ranger
1990s French sport aircraft
1990s French ultralight aircraft
1990s French civil utility aircraft
Single-engined tractor aircraft
High-wing aircraft
Homebuilt aircraft